{{Infobox military conflict
|conflict=Battle of Leghorn
|partof=the First Anglo-Dutch War
| image= Reinier Nooms - De zeeslag bij Livorno.jpg
| image_size = 300
|caption=The Battle of Leghorn, 4 March 1653 by Reinier Nooms, painted mid-17th century
|date=4 March 1653
|place=near Leghorn, Italy
|casus=
|territory=
|result=Dutch victory
|combatant1= Commonwealth of England
|combatant2=
|commander1=Henry AppletonRichard Badiley
|commander2=Johan van Galen
|strength1=15 warships
|strength2=16 warships
|casualties1=2 ships sunk3 ships captured150 dead or injured50 captured
|casualties2=Unknown
|campaignbox=

}}
The naval Battle of Leghorn  took place on 4 March 1653 (14 March Gregorian calendar),
  during the First Anglo-Dutch War, near Leghorn (Livorno), Italy. It was a victory of a Dutch squadron under Commodore Johan van Galen over an English squadron under Captain Henry Appleton. Afterwards, another English squadron under Captain Richard Badiley, which Appleton had been trying to join up with, reached the scene in time to observe the capture of the last ships of Appleton's squadron, but was outnumbered and forced to return to Porto Longone.

Background
In 1652 the government of the Commonwealth of England, mistakenly believing that the United Provinces after their defeat at the Battle of the Kentish Knock would desist from bringing out fleets so late in the season, split their fleet between the Mediterranean and home waters. This division of forces led to a defeat at the Battle of Dungeness in December 1652, and by early 1653 the situation in the Mediterranean was critical too. Appleton's squadron of six ships (including four hired merchantmen) was trapped in Leghorn by a blockading Dutch fleet of 16 ships, while Richard Badiley's of eight (also including four hired merchantmen) was at Elba.

The only hope for the English was to combine their forces, but Appleton sailed too soon and engaged with the Dutch before Badiley could come up to help. Three of his ships were captured and two destroyed and only one (Mary), sailing faster than the Dutch ships, escaped to join Badiley. Badiley engaged the Dutch, but was heavily outnumbered and retreated.

The battle gave the Dutch command of the Mediterranean, placing the English trade with the Levant at their mercy, but Van Galen was mortally wounded, dying on 13 March.

One of the Dutch captains at the battle was son of Lieutenant-Admiral Maarten Tromp, Cornelis Tromp, who was to become a famous admiral himself.

Ships involved
United Provinces of the Netherlands
Johan van GalenVereenigde Provincien/Zeven Provincien (United Provinces/Seven Provinces) 40 (flag)Eendracht (Concord) 40 (Jacob de Boer)Maan (Moon) 40 (Cornelis Tromp)Ter Goes 40 (Jan Richewijn)Zon (Sun) 40 (Pieter van Zalingen)Zutphen 36 (Jan Uijttenhout)Maagd van Enkhuysen (Maiden of Enkhuysen) 34 (Jan Roetering)Jonge Prins (Young Prince) 28 (Cornelis Barentszoon)Julius Caesar 28 (hired merchantman) (Jacon Janszoon Roocher)Witte Olifant (White Elephant) (hired Italian merchantman Elefante Bianco) 28 (Sijbrant Janszoon Mol)Madonna della Vigna 28 (hired merchantman) (Harman Sonne) - Ran aground north of Livorno harbor, but salvedSusanna 28 (hired merchantman) (Daniel Janszoon de Vries)Zwarte Arend (Black Eagle) 28 (Pieter Janszoon van Bontebotter)Salomons Oordeel (Judgment of Soloman) 28 (hired merchantman) (Meijndert Theunissen van Oosterwout)Roode Haes (Red Hare) 28 (hired merchantman) (Adriaan Rodenhaes)Ster (Star) 28 (hired merchantman) (Hendrik Govertszoon)

The Eendracht and Jonge Prins were ships of the Noorderkwartier Admiralty, all the others (including the hired merchantmen) pertained to the Amsterdam Admiralty.

Commonwealth of England
Capt. Henry Appleton's squadronBonaventure 44 (Stephen Lyne) - Blown up by Vereenigde ProvincienLeopard 48 ('flagship' of Appleton) - Captured (by Eendracht?)Samson 40 (hired merchantman, Edmund Seaman) - Burnt by fireshipMary 30 (hired merchantman, Benjamin Fisher)Peregrine 30 (hired merchantman, John Wood) - Captured by Zwarte ArendLevant Merchant 28/30? (hired merchantman, Stephen Marsh) - Captured by Maagd van EnkhuysenCapt. Richard Badiley's squadronParagon 52 ('flagship' of Badiley)Phoenix 36 (Owen Cox)Elizabeth 36 (Jonas Reeves)Constant Warwick 32 (Upshott)Mary Rose 32 (hired merchantman, John Turtley)Lewis 30 (hired merchantman, William Elle)William and Thomas 30 (hired merchantman, John Godolphin)Thomas Bonaventure 28 (hired merchantman, George Hughes)? (fireship, Peter Whyting)

The fireship is listed as Charity in Mariner's Mirror vol. 49, but according to Mariner's Mirror vol. 24 that ship was expended during an action off Plymouth on 27 August 1652.

Notes

ReferencesMariner's Mirror volume 24 (1938)Mariner's Mirror'' volume 49 (1963)

Leghorn
1653 in Europe
Leghorn
Livorno